VC Iskra Odintsovo is a professional Volleyball team based in Odintsovo, Russia.

Palmarès
Russian Volleyball Super League
Runners-up (4) : 1994, 2003, 2008, 2009
Third place (5) : 1999, 2000, 2001, 2006, 2007
CEV Champions League
Runners-up (1): 2004
Third place (1): 2009

Notable players 
  Pavel Abramov 
  Aleksandr Butko 
  Andrey Egorchev
  Pavel Kruglov 
  Aleksey Kuleshov 
  Aleksey Spiridonov 
  Aleksey Verbov
  Giba
  Guillaume Samica
  Jochen Schöps
  Guido Görtzen
  Veljko Petković

Famous coaches
  Zoran Gajić

External links
Official site

Russian volleyball clubs
Sport in Moscow Oblast